Sun Fo or Sun Ke (21 October 1891 – 13 September 1973), courtesy name Zhesheng, was a high-ranking official in the government of the Republic of China. He was the son of Sun Yat-sen, the founder of the Republic of China, and his first wife Lu Muzhen.

Biography

Sun was born in HeungShan (now Zhongshan), Guangdong, China. He travelled abroad to study, graduated in 1911 from Saint Louis College (now Saint Louis School, K-12, Honolulu, Hawaii), earned a Bachelor of Arts from the University of California, Berkeley in 1916 and a Master of Science from Columbia University in 1917. He also received an honorary LL.D. from Columbia. He married Chen Suk-ying and had two sons (Sun Tse-ping and Sun Tse-kiong) and two daughters (Sun Sui-ying and Sun Sui-hwa). He had two more daughters; Sun Sui-fong with Yan Ai-juang, and Sun Sui-fen with Lan Yi. Most of his children, including daughters, went on to have successful careers in public.

After returning to China, Sun was appointed Mayor of Guangzhou (Canton), where the Kuomintang's government headed by his father was headquartered, serving from 1920 to 1922 and again from 1923 to 1925 (between 1922 and 1923, Sun Yat-sen was exiled by Chen Jiongming). As recorded in a China Mail (a Chinese newspaper) on 4 June 1923,  there was controversy in relation to a case involving 50,000 yuan and Sun Fo. The case was voiced in public through Chan Po-yin (陳步賢; 1883–1965), a Senator of Guangzhou. In the Nationalist government, Sun served as Minister of Communications from 1926 to 1927, as Minister of Finance from 1927 to 1928 and Minister of Railways from 1928 to 1931.

In 1928, he became President of Chiao Tung University in Shanghai, and made many administrative and educational reforms, including introducing a Moral Education Department. He created the Science College, which incorporated three departments (Mathematics, Physics, and Chemistry).

In 1931, the near civil war caused by the arrest of Hu Hanmin and the invasion of Manchuria forced Chiang Kai-shek to resign.  For one month, he was President of the Executive Yuan (Premier). He found the government was paralyzed by the absence of the party's Big Three: Hu, Chiang, and Wang Jingwei. High level negotiations brought the latter two back into politics with Wang becoming premier.

Sun disagreed with Chiang extensively on their objectives, Sun desired to put off war against the Communists in favor of war against Japan, and reach an agreement with the Communists.

Sun became President of the Legislative Yuan from 1932 to 1948 (the first to head the Legislative Yuan under the 1947 Chinese Constitution, which he helped frame). From 1947 to 1948 he was Vice Chairman of the Nationalist Government and he served again as President of the Executive Yuan from 1948. During this time, he gained the reputation of having an "iron neck" —an outspoken liberal against Chiang Kai-shek's authoritarian tendencies, he could not be purged because he was the son of Sun Yat-sen. In the first election for president and vice president under the new Constitution in 1948, Sun stood for the vice presidency against Li Zongren and Cheng Chien. Despite his previous veiled criticisms of Chiang, Sun remained the favored choice of Chiang, but Li (one of Chiang's rivals in the Kuomintang) won the election.

He was a member of the Kuomintang Central Executive Committee from 1926 to 1950. Leading the left wing of the Kuomintang, he advocated cooperation with the Communist Party of China in the fight against the Japanese military occupation of 1931–1945, and represented his party in negotiations with Zhou Enlai.

Following the full-scale Japanese invasion of 1937, Sun Fo was tasked with obtaining military assistance from the Allied Powers. Turned down by the U.S., Britain, and France, he turned to the Soviet Union. In direct talks with Joseph Stalin in 1937, 1938, and 1939, he secured the crucial arms and ammunition that prevented the total defeat of Nationalist forces. But while Chiang Kai-shek wanted the arms primarily to fight the Communists, Sun Fo insisted that the threat to China's national integrity came foremost from the invading outside forces.

At the end of the Chinese Civil War in 1949, he exiled himself to Hong Kong until 1951, and moved to Europe (stops in Paris and Spain) from 1951 to 1952, and finally resided in the United States (Los Angeles) from 1952 to 1965.

After years of political differences with Chiang Kai-shek, Sun Fo returned to serve in the government of the Republic of China in Taipei as a senior advisor to President Chiang from 1965, and as President of the Examination Yuan from 1966 until his death in 1973. He was also Chairman of the Board of Trustees of Soochow University in Taiwan from 1966 to 1973.

Sun Fo and his wife are buried at Yangmingshan Private Cemetery, in the Beitou District, Taipei, Taiwan.

References

1891 births
1973 deaths
Columbia University alumni
Chinese Christians
Politicians from Zhongshan
Mayors of Guangzhou
Taiwanese politicians of Hakka descent
Members of the 1st Legislative Yuan
Presidents of the Legislative Yuan
Sun Yat-sen family
Premiers of the Republic of China
Taiwanese Presidents of the Examination Yuan
Republic of China politicians from Guangdong
Members of the Kuomintang
Children of national leaders of China
Chinese Civil War refugees
Taiwanese people from Guangdong
Presidents of Shanghai Jiao Tong University
Chinese people in rail transport